"A Place with No Name" is a song by American singer Michael Jackson released on the second posthumous Jackson album, Xscape (2014). A 24-second snippet of the full song was released posthumously by website TMZ.com on July 16, 2009, three weeks after Jackson's death. The full version leaked online on December 3, 2013. The track is based on "A Horse with No Name", the hit 1972 song by rock band America. At the time of the leak, America stated that they were "honored" that Michael Jackson chose to sample their work.

It has been claimed that there are "dozens and dozens" of unreleased Jackson songs that could be issued for several years to come. The song was contemporized by Norwegian producers StarGate for Xscape, along with the original version. "A Place with No Name" was released to American urban adult contemporary radio on August 12, 2014.

Background
On June 25, 2009, musician Michael Jackson died following what was initially reported as a cardiac arrest.<ref name="Michael Jackson, 'King of Pop', dead at 50", However, later on it was determined that Jackson died of a drug overdose of propofol and lorazepam and his death was ruled a homicide. On July 16, 2009, celebrity news website TMZ.com—the first media outlet to report the death—released a 24-second snippet of an unreleased Jackson song, "A Place with No Name". The track is based on America's 1972 number-one single "A Horse with No Name". Jackson had legal permission to use the song. The St. Louis Post-Dispatch stated that the two songs were "just about identical". It is not known when the track was recorded, although Jackson and America shared a manager—believed to be Jim Morey—in the late 1980s and late 1990s.

According to producer Dr. Freeze, the version of "A Place with No Name" that leaked is the final version Michael heard and approved in 2008, which is credited as the original version in the deluxe edition of Xscape. it was the last CD single released by Jackson. Prior to the leak of the original version in December 2013, a cover of Jackson's work was posted at YouTube in January 2011, recorded by a mysterious person with a pseudonym "Spino".

Music videos
On August 13, 2014, "A Place With No Name" marks the first time a music video has ever debuted exclusively on Twitter. Along with its tweet premiere, "A Place With No Name" was also shown on the Sony video screen in Times Square on Wednesday night at 10 p.m. It was uploaded to Michael Jackson's VEVO page the following day. In line with the desert theme featured in the lyrics of America's "A Horse with No Name", the video stars dancers Alvester Martin, who worked with Jackson for ten years, and Danielle Acoff in new dance sequences in a desert. Also featured are rare clips from Jackson's "In the Closet" video shoot. The music video was directed by Samuel Bayer.

A second music video was released on Michael Jackson's VEVO page on August 28, 2014, with choreographed dances performed by the dancers from Cirque du Soleil's "Michael Jackson: One" world tour. It was filmed at different places in Los Angeles, but most of the video was shot inside the "Michael Jackson: ONE" Boutique inside Mandalay Bay.

Critical reception

Joe Levy from Billboard called the song the "centerpiece" of the album. Meggie Morris from Renowned for Sound called the track "unknown and at the same time familiar, producing a sound that is retro and classic, rather than dated." However, Nekesa Mumbi Moody from Yahoo! said "A Place With No Name" "has the same beat and sound as 'Leave Me Alone' from the 'Bad' era and is lyrically weak: we can tell why Jackson left it on the cutting room floor."

Response from America
Dewey Bunnell and Gerry Beckley—two members of the three part band—conveyed their gratitude toward Jackson for choosing their song as a musical template for "A Place with No Name". In their statement to MTV, the musicians also expressed regret that Jackson's fans did not get to hear the finished version of the track while Jackson was alive:

We're honored that Michael Jackson chose to record it and we're impressed with the quality of the track. We're also hoping it will be released soon so that music listeners around the world can hear the whole song and once again experience the incomparable brilliance of Michael Jackson [...] Michael Jackson really did it justice and we truly hope his fans—and our fans—get to hear it in its entirety. It's really poignant.

Bunnell further commented that he was "very proud of the fact that [Jackson] recorded it. It's a good version and an interesting derivative of the original that I wrote." Bunnel said that he and Beckley were "in the dark" regarding the future of Jackson's unreleased material.

Track listing

Notes
  signifies a vocal producer
  signifies a co-producer
  signifies an additional producer

Charts

Weekly charts

Year-end charts

See also
 List of unreleased Michael Jackson material
 Death of Michael Jackson

References

1998 songs
2014 songs
2014 singles
Michael Jackson songs
Songs written by Michael Jackson
Songs written by Dewey Bunnell
Song recordings produced by Michael Jackson
Song recordings produced by Stargate (record producers)
Music videos directed by Samuel Bayer
Songs released posthumously
Songs written by Dr. Freeze
Song recordings produced by Dr. Freeze